Pedro Martínez Losa (born 9 May 1976) is a Spanish football coach and sporting director, who is currently the head coach of the Scotland women's national team. Known primarily for his prominence within women's football, Martínez Losa has won major trophies in his native Spain with Rayo Vallecano Femenino, and in England with Arsenal Women.

Career
Martínez Losa has built up nearly 20 years' coaching experience, proving particularly adept at raising the level of professionalism at the clubs he has worked at. He began his coaching career at Pozuelo Alarcón, with their U-13, U-14 and U-15 boys' teams, and also had a stint coaching U-9, U-10 & U-12 boys' sides at Atlético Madrid. 

Martínez Losa then started to coach women's football teams, first with the head coach's position at Pozuelo Alarcón before moving on to take the top job at Rayo Vallecano Femenino. His tenure with Rayo was very successful, leading the club to their first major trophy in their history with the Copa de la Reina in 2008. Rayo then went on to win the league title for three consecutive seasons (2008–09, 2009–10 and 2010–11) and reached the quarter-finals of the UEFA Women's Champions League in 2011.

In 2012, he moved to the United States to the Western New York Flash as assistant coach to Aaran Lines while he was also handed the role of Advanced Training Instructor at the Flash Youth Academy. In his first season with the Flash, they were joint winners of the National Women's Soccer League (alongside Portland Thorns and Kansas City), but in the subsequent play-offs they lost the championship final to Portland. While still a part of the Flash set up, Losa spent the 2013 season as assistant coach to Niagara Purple Eagles women's soccer coach Peter Veltri.

In 2014, Martínez Losa was named as the new manager of Arsenal Women, succeeding Shelley Kerr. With Arsenal, he led the team to the 2015 FA WSL Cup and the 2016 FA Women's Cup. He also helped lay the foundations for the team's current success by signing the likes of Dominique Janssen, Sari van Veenendaal, Katie McCabe, Daniëlle van de Donk, Kim Little, Beth Mead and Vivianne Miedema. Losa's time in charge also included bringing through youngsters of the quality of Leah Williamson, Charlie Devlin and Lauren James. Martínez Losa left Arsenal in October 2017, following a mixed start to the season. In July 2018, he was appointed Director of Football for Millwall Lionesses, but left in June 2019, when the club broke away from the men's side and became the London City Lionesses.

On 7 June 2019, Martínez Losa was named as the new manager of Division 1 Féminine club FC Girondins de Bordeaux, succeeding Jérôme Dauba. In his first season at the club, in 19/20, Bordeaux achieved their all-time best top-division finish of 3rd place, with Martínez Losa named D1 Arkema coach of the season by French women's football site L'Équipière.  In the 20/21 campaign, Bordeaux are on course to repeat that achievement, which would bring with it the club's first ever participation in the UEFA Women's Champions League.

Martínez Losa was appointed head coach of the Scotland women's national team in July 2021.

Honours

Manager
Rayo Vallecano Femenino

 Primera División: 2008–09, 2009–10, 2010–11
 Copa de la Reina: 2008

Arsenal Women

 FA Women's Cup: 2016
 FA WSL Cup: 2015

References

1976 births
Living people
Spanish football managers
Sportspeople from Madrid
Polytechnic University of Madrid alumni
Arsenal W.F.C. managers
Women's Super League managers
Scotland women's national football team managers
Spanish expatriate football managers
Expatriate football managers in England
Expatriate football managers in Scotland
Expatriate football managers in France
Expatriate soccer managers in the United States
Spanish expatriate sportspeople in England
Spanish expatriate sportspeople in Scotland
Spanish expatriate sportspeople in France
Spanish expatriate sportspeople in the United States
Rayo Vallecano non-playing staff
Primera División (women) managers